Zubovskia is a genus of insect in family Acrididae. It contains the following species:
 Zubovskia banatica

References 

Acrididae genera
Taxonomy articles created by Polbot